Snezhina (Bulgarian: Снежина) is a village in eastern Bulgaria. It is located in the municipality of Provadiya, Varna Province.

As of September 2015 the village has a population of 539.

References

Villages in Varna Province